The 2015 Nigerian Senate election in Osun State was held on March 28, 2015, to elect members of the Nigerian Senate to represent Osun State. Olusola Adeyeye representing Osun Central, Christopher Omoworare Babajide representing Osun East and Isiaka Adeleke representing Osun West all won on the platform of All Progressives Congress.

Overview

Summary

Results

Osun Central 
All Progressives Congress candidate Olusola Adeyeye won the election, defeating People's Democratic Party candidate Oluwole Aina and other party candidates.

Osun East 
All Progressives Congress candidate Christopher Omoworare Babajide won the election, defeating People's Democratic Party candidate Fadahunsi Adenigba and other party candidates.

Osun West 
All Progressives Congress candidate Isiaka Adeleke won the election, defeating People's Democratic Party candidate Olasunkanmi Akinlabi and other party candidates.

References 

Osun State Senate elections
March 2015 events in Nigeria
Osu